"Divas Need Love Too" is a single recorded by Klymaxx for the MCA label. Relying on an outside producer and songwriters, this song was recorded and released as the fourth and final single from their fifth album, Klymaxx. This song reached number 14 on the Billboard R&B Singles chart.

Credits
Lead vocals Lorena Porter and Bernadette Cooper
Background vocals by  Klymaxx
Written by Bernadette Cooper, Victor Brantley and Rick Timas.

1987 singles
Klymaxx songs
1986 songs
MCA Records singles